On 18 June 2017, gunmen attacked Le Campement Kangaba in Dougourakoro, east of Bamako, Mali, a luxury resort frequented by tourists. Hostages were reported to have been taken and at least 5 people are reported to have been killed, including a Franco-Gabonese civilian, a Chinese citizen and a Portuguese soldier. According to an eyewitness, the attack began when a man on a motorcycle arrived at the compound and fired at the crowd. He was followed by two other assailants. Security forces stationed at the resort held off the attack for several hours while awaiting reinforcements. Once arrived, the United Nations troops managed to rescue around 60 people staying at the resort. Some residents hid in a cave near the resort and managed to avoid the attackers.

Al-Qaeda in the Islamic Maghreb claimed responsibility for the attack, and Mali security minister Salif Traoré confirmed it was a jihadist attack. Malian troops and France's Operation Barkhane counter-terrorist force came to the site. Four assailants were killed in the aftermath and four arrested.

Aftermath

Casualties

Decorations 
Spanish Army Commander Miguel Angel Franco Fernandez was awarded the European Union's Common Security and Defence Policy Service Medal for his efforts in defending the civilians at the hotel.

See also
 2015 Bamako hotel attack

References

2017 in Mali
Attacks on hotels in Africa
Attacks on tourists
History of Bamako
Hostage taking
Islamic terrorism in Mali
Islamic terrorist incidents in 2017
June 2017 crimes in Africa
June 2017 events in Africa
Mass murder in 2017
Mass shootings in Africa
Terrorist incidents attributed to al-Qaeda in the Islamic Maghreb
Organisation internationale de la Francophonie
Terrorist incidents in Mali
2017 murders in Mali
Terrorist incidents in Mali in 2017